Deweni Inima is a 2017 Sinhalese Sri Lankan television prime-time soap opera which premiered on 6 February 2017 on TV Derana. The series is directed by Saranga Mendis, produced by Chamika Mendis and written by Saman Edirimunee. It airs every weekday from 8:30 p.m. to 9:00 p.m.

Plot

The main storyline is about two half-brothers, Anuhas Fernando and Awantha Fernando.
They both are the sons of well-known business man and cricketer Ravi Fenando. Anuhas lives with his mother Udeni and runs a juice bar. They are very closely associated with Udeni's brother Ananda and his family, including his wife Anusha, elder son Dhanuka and younger daughter Dewmi.

Meanwhile Awantha is living with his father and spoilt mother Ameesha in a luxurious way. Ameesha always betrays Udeni and Anuhas and underestimates them. Awantha has a relationship with a fatherless child called Samalka, who was the daughter of a shareholder in Ravi's business. Her mother is in a mental hospital, which is a secret. Awantha is a notoriously rude spoilt student. Anuhas has two best friends, Mike and Chubby. Awantha always traps Anuhas on various matters to torture him which causes the two to fight. Coach Ekanayaka makes Anuhas captain of the school cricket team, making Awantha and Ameesha more enraged. Over time, Awantha tries to attract the attention of Dewmi, who is the cousin sister of Anuhas and a good friend of Samalka; their friendship develops after the singing competition. Over time Samalka is helped by Anuhas. Awantha and Dewmi secretly develop their relationship. Anuhas also builds a relationship with Samalka. Ravi Fernando dies from a heart attack in Australia. After finding out that Samalka was badly cheated by Mr. Samaranayaka, Samalka decides to become a Buddhist nun, leaving Lihini, the newcomer and best friend to live in a village alone. Lihini convinces Anuhas and they build a good relationship while Dewmi and Awantha's relationship faces many challenges because of family disputes.

Anuhas and Awantha are united after their father's death. Ameesha tries multiple times to separate them and fails. Meanwhile Dhanuka, Dewmi's brother, marries an employee in Ravi's business. The brothers are united and face many troubles caused by Menaka. Later, Dewmi and Awantha's relationship is accepted by both families; at the last moment they are separated by one of Menaka's tricks. Anuhas builds a relationship with Aksha, the younger sister of Samalka. Samalka's mother is treated and fully recovers.

Meanwhile, Udeni hands over the juice bar to Chubby and Mike, who run it well. Lihini's sister, Saheli comes to board with her to attend Colombo School like Lihini. Malinda, who was a great friend of Dewmi, builds a relationship with Saheli, Lihini's sister, which fails after Saheli moves to the village. Radeesh, who is Ameesha's brother's son, comes to Sri Lanka from Canada. He meets up with Lihini and starts a relationship which is highly accepted by Radeesh's father but not by spoilt mother and sister of Radeesh. Anuhas, Aksha and Awantha try to find who is tricking them and rebuild their business with the help of Radeesh, while Dewmi and Awantha try to strengthen their relationship and marry with their families' blessings.

Cast

Main cast
 Raween Kanishka as Anuhas Fernando
 Keshan Shashindra as Awantha Fernando 
 Nayanathara Wickramaarachchi as Dewmi Uththara
 Nethmi Roshel as Aksha
 Himali Sayurangi as Udeni

Supporting cast

 Ishara Madushan as Radeesh
 Upeka Ranasinghe as Lihini
 Dharmapriya Dias as Ananda 
 Anjula Rajapaksha as Ameesha
 Rex Kodippili as Ronnie Fernando
 Anjalee Liyanage as Anusha
 Dev Surendra as Dhanuka
 Denuwan Senadheera as Mike (Supun Sampath)
 Sudath Anthony as Dilan
 Milinda Madugalle as Menaka
 Tharushi Perera as Shanthi
 Dineth Epaliyana as Malintha

Minor cast
 Sameera Eriyagama as Milan
 Aruni Mendis as Nilu
 Ishani Wijethunge as Aruni Kalupahana 
 Jagath Apaladeniya as Lawyer Samaranayake
 Dilki Dissanayake as Pawani
 Thusitha Laknath as Rane
 Sarath Kulanga as Karune
 Theekshana Manaram as Some
 Avishka Umayangi as Nethmi 
 Richard Weerakkodi as Loku Appa
 Chamara Bandaranayake as Ashoka

Former cast
 Bimal Jayakody as Ravi Fernando 
 Shanudrie Priyasad as Samalka Samadhi / Khema Theraniyo
 Palitha Silva as Coach Ekanayake 
 Sahan Ranwala as Lawyer Neil Weheragala 
 Shalini Fernando as Lihini
 Buddhika Jayaratne as Deshan Silva
 Kanishka Prasad as Chubby (Dasun Chamara)
 Emasha Seneviratne as Saheli 
 Sangeetha Basnayake as Kanthi 
 Chirantha Ranwala as Boys' School Principal
 Samanthi Lanarolle as the Girls' School Teacher
 Sachini Wickramasinghe as Mihiri 
 Maneesha Namalgama as Malintha's Mother 
 Dammika Aluthgedara as Ramanayake Sir
 Himaya Bandara as Sonali Teacher
 Denuwan Sri Bandara as Pinto
 Laksith Randika as Sanjaya
 Sachin Chathuranga as Sandun  
 Rangana Jayathilake as Sumane
 Prabath Chathuranga as Dhaneesha 
 Nirukshan Ekanayake as Sheran 
 Thrishala Nathashi as Madhuka 
 Ryan Van Rooyen as Lionel Sandun 
 Vidhushi Uththara as Malki 
 Nilwala Wishwamali as Kalani 
 Sudarshi Galanigama as the Girls' School Principal 
 Thusitha Dhanushka as Mental Hospital Doctor
 Nimmi Priyadarshani as Buddhist Nun
 Duminda Danthanarayana as Police Inspector
 Wilmon Sirimanne as Dolagala Veda Mahattaya 
 Hirushi Perera as Thameera
 Priyantha Wijekoon as Lasantha 
 Boniface Jayasantha as Dharme

Reception 
The first episode of Deweni Inima was telecast on 6 February 2017 on TV Derana. It was telecast on weekdays at 8:30 p.m. Within a short time it became the most popular teledrama in Sri Lanka. Deweni Inima received the most popular teledrama award in Raigam Tele'es, Sumathi Awards and SLIM-Nielsen Peoples Awards several times. According to LMRB ratings, Deweni Inima is the most-watched television programme among all categories in Sri Lanka. The 1000th episode of Deweni Inima was telecast on 5 February 2021.

However, the drama has gradually been panned for being an "endless loop" of monotonously dull scriptwriting, with criticism being aimed by the audience at how the drama is no longer based on Cricket, despite the drama's misleading title. The drama currently holds an IMDb rating of 1.0, based on over 1000 votes, and has been named "one of the worst TV shows" in Sri Lanka by a majority of critics.

Awards

Soundtrack

See also
 TV Derana

References

Sri Lankan drama television series
2010s television soap operas
TV Derana original programming